Želetava is a market town in Třebíč District in the Vysočina Region of the Czech Republic. It has about 1,500 inhabitants.

Administrative parts
Villages of Bítovánky, Horky and Šašovice are administrative parts of Želetava.

Geography
It lies in the Křižanov Highlands. The Želetavka River springs here and flows through the municipal territory. There are several ponds fed by the Želetavka.

History
The first written mention of Želetava is from 1303. In 1370, it was promoted to a market town.

Economy
Želetava is known for a cheese factory, which has been operating since 1902. Since 2000, the factory has been owned by Bel Group.

Sights
The landmark of Želetava is the Church of Saint Michael the Archangel with a tall prismatic tower. It has a Gothic core with Baroque modifications. In front of the church are two valuable statues of Saints John the Baptist and John of Nepomuk.

Other sights include the Chapel of Saint Catherine, and the Chapel of Saint Anthony of Padua in Horky.

References

External links

Populated places in Třebíč District
Market towns in the Czech Republic